Legislative elections were held in Åland on 20 October 1991 to elect members of the Landstinget. The 30 members were elected for a four-year term by proportional representation.

Following the elections, the previous government of the Åland Centre, Liberals for Åland and Freeminded Co-operation parties, was replaced by one formed of the Åland Centre, Freeminded Co-operation and Åland Social Democrats.

Results

References

External links
Parties and Elections in Europe
Legislative Assembly elections

Elections in Åland
Aland
Aland
Aland